Chitrasen Sinku (born 27 September 1950) is an Indian politician and member of Eleventh Lok Sabha.

References

Living people
Indian National Congress politicians from Jharkhand
1950 births